AS-101 (also designated SA-6) was the sixth flight of the Saturn I launch vehicle, which carried the first boilerplate Apollo spacecraft into low Earth orbit. The test took place on May 28, 1964, lasting for four orbits (about six hours). The spacecraft and its upper stage completed a total of 54 orbits before reentering the atmosphere and crashing in the Pacific Ocean on June 1, 1964.

The flight experienced a single anomaly: one of the eight first-stage Saturn I engines shut down early, but the guidance system compensated by burning the remaining seven engines longer. AS-101 was followed by four more flights to verify the launch aerodynamics of the Apollo command and service module (CSM) and its launch escape system (LES) tower.

Boilerplate Apollo 
The first five launches of the Saturn I had carried Jupiter nosecones, a proven design which allowed engineers to focus on development of the rocket. The boilerplate spacecraft was instrumented with 116 sensors reading strain, pressure, temperature, heat flux, and acceleration.

Flight 

It took three attempts to launch the rocket from Cape Kennedy Air Force Station Space Launch Complex 37B. The first attempt was scrubbed after the liquid oxygen damaged a wire mesh screen during a test, causing fuel contamination. The second attempt was scrubbed after the rocket's guidance system overheated due to failure of an air conditioning compressor.

The vehicle finally lifted off on May 28, 1964. There had been several delays during the countdown as liquid oxygen vapors obscured an optical window in the SA-6's instrument unit, so that a ground-based theodolite could not see it. This theodolite was required by the countdown computer in order for launch to proceed. Engineers deemed it non-critical and reprogrammed the computer, allowing the launch to proceed.

The ascent was normal up to 116.9 seconds after liftoff, at which point engine number eight shut off early. This was not planned, as it had been on SA-4 as a test, but the rocket compensated perfectly by burning the remaining fuel in the other seven engines for 2.7 seconds longer than planned. The first stage separated and the second stage ignited. Ten seconds later, the launch escape system was jettisoned as planned. Also jettisoned from the first stage were eight film cameras that observed separation of the stages.

It continued to transmit data for four orbits, after which the batteries failed. The vehicle made a total of 54 orbits, re-entering the atmosphere east of Kanton Island in the Pacific Ocean on June 1.

Engine failure cause 
Engineers were quick to find the cause of the failure of engine number eight. The teeth on one of the gears in the turbopump were stripped off. This did not cause any delays in the next launches as engineers had already decided that the gear design was inferior and were planning to change it for the next launch. This was the only problem encountered with an H-1 engine during a flight.

References

External links 

The Apollo Spacecraft: A Chronology 
NASA Space Science Data Coordinated Archive
Moonport: A History of Apollo Launch Facilities and Operations 
http://science.ksc.nasa.gov/history/apollo/sa-6/sa-6.html 
Stages to Saturn
Postlaunch Report for Apollo Mission A-101

Apollo program
Spacecraft launched in 1964
Spacecraft which reentered in 1964
Test spaceflights
Spacecraft launched by Saturn rockets